Gordon Brown (30 June 1933 – August 2005) was an English footballer who played as an inside forward. Brown made over 250 appearances in the Football League for six clubs over a period of thirteen years, scoring over 100 goals.

Career
Born in Eastham, near Ellesmere Port, Brown began his senior career with boyhood club Wolverhampton Wanderers in 1951, although he never made a league appearance for Wolves. He also played in the Football League for Scunthorpe United, Derby County, Southampton, Barrow and Southport, before playing non-league football with Morecambe.

References

External links

1933 births
People from Ellesmere Port
Sportspeople from Cheshire
English footballers
Wolverhampton Wanderers F.C. players
Scunthorpe United F.C. players
Derby County F.C. players
Southampton F.C. players
Barrow A.F.C. players
Southport F.C. players
Morecambe F.C. players
English Football League players
2005 deaths
Association football inside forwards